Yesipovo is a rural locality (a village) in Vakhnevskoye Rural Settlement, Nikolsky District, Vologda Oblast, Russia. The population was 76 as of 2002.

Geography 
Yesipovo is located 42 km northwest of Nikolsk (the district's administrative centre) by road. Chernino is the nearest rural locality.

References 

Rural localities in Nikolsky District, Vologda Oblast